Volost was a traditional administrative subdivision in Eastern Europe.

In earlier East Slavic history, volost was a name for the territory ruled by the knyaz, a principality; either as an absolute ruler or with varying degree of autonomy from the Velikiy Knyaz (Grand Prince). Starting from the end of the 14th century, volost was a unit of administrative division in Grand Duchy of Lithuania, Poland, Muscovy, lands of modern Latvia and Ukraine. Since about the 16th century it was a part of provincial districts that were called "uezd" in Muscovy and the later Russian Empire. Each uezd had several volosts that were subordinated to the uezd city.

After the abolition of Russian serfdom in 1861, volost became a unit of peasant's local self-rule. A number of mirs are united into a volost, which has an assembly consisting of elected delegates from the mirs. These elect an elder (starshina) and, hitherto, a court of justice (volostnoy sud). The self-government of the mirs and volosts was, however, tempered by the authority of the police commissaries (stanovoi) and by the power of general oversight given to the nominated "district committees for the affairs of the peasants".

Volosts were abolished by the Soviet administrative reform of 1923–1929. Raions may be roughly called a modern equivalent of both volosts and uezds.

Administration
Volosts were governed by volost administration (volostnoye pravleniye), which consisted of the electable chief of volost (volostnoy starshina), chiefs of villages (village starostas) and other officials electable by the Volost Assembly (волостной сход, volostnoy skhod).

Volost Court was the court electable by the Volost Assembly, which could handle smaller civil and criminal cases. It could sentence people to corporal punishment, fine or short-term incarceration.

Russian Federation
In modern Russia, the term has a different meaning. The subdivision into volosts is used in the Republic of Karelia, where volosts have the same status as raions,  and in Leningrad, Pskov, Samara, and Tula Oblasts, where volosts are considered subdivisions of raions and have the same status as selsovets in other Russian federal subjects.

See also
 Veps National Volost within the Russian Republic of Karelia

Notes

Types of administrative division
Former subdivisions of Belarus
Local government in the Russian Empire
Russian-language designations of territorial entities